"T.N.T." is a song released in 1975 by Australian hard rock band AC/DC, taken from their Australian album T.N.T. and the international version of High Voltage. It was released as a single in 1976 and was written by Bon Scott, Angus Young and Malcolm Young. It peaked at No.19 on the Australian Kent Music Report Singles Chart. The song's title is a reference to the explosive chemical TNT.

A slightly modified line from the song, "Lock up your daughters", was used as the title of AC/DC's first headlining tour of Great Britain in 1976 after the band's move from Melbourne, Australia, to London, earlier that year. "T.N.T." later appeared on Live and the Live: 2 CD Collector's Edition, with Brian Johnson providing vocals.

In January 2018, as part of Triple M's "Ozzest 100", the 'most Australian' songs of all time, "T.N.T." was ranked number 81.

Personnel
 Bon Scott – lead vocals
 Angus Young – lead guitar
 Malcolm Young – rhythm guitar, backing vocals
 Mark Evans – bass guitar
 Phil Rudd – drums
 Harry Vanda – producer
 George Young – producer

Charts

Certifications

Covers
American death metal band Six Feet Under recorded a cover version of the song for their album Graveyard Classics.

Anthrax version

The Anthrax cover of this song was released on their 2013 covers EP Anthems. They debuted the song live 21 February 2013 at The HiFi in Brisbane, Australia ahead of Soundwave. Later on their tour in the US, Slash and Kirk Hammett (at separate gigs) joined them for this song.

In popular culture
The Anthrax version of the song is used for the Calgary Flames' goal song.
The song was played in commercials for the 2004 film Napoleon Dynamite.
The song  appears on the soundtrack and the intro to the 2002 skateboarding video game Tony Hawk's Pro Skater 4.
After the September 11 attacks, the song was included on a widely circulated Clear Channel employee's list of potentially upsetting songs.
The song is featured in the 2006 film Talladega Nights: The Ballad of Ricky Bobby.
The song is heard in the 2010-2014 NASCAR on TNT.

References

AC/DC songs
1976 singles
Songs written by Bon Scott
Songs written by Angus Young
Songs written by Malcolm Young
Song recordings produced by Harry Vanda
1975 songs
Song recordings produced by George Young (rock musician)
Albert Productions singles